Hueinahue River is a river in Futrono and Lago Ranco communes, southern Chile. It drains waters from the cordillera at the Argentine border west to Maihue Lake, which in turn flows by Calcurrupe River into Ranco Lake. The river flows in an east-west direction along the Futrono Fault.

See also
 List of rivers of Chile

Rivers of Chile
Rivers of Los Ríos Region